was an administrative division of Korea under Japanese rule, with its capital at Kaishū (now Haeju, North Korea). The province consisted of what is now the Hwanghae Province of North Korea.

Population 
Number of people by nationality according to the 1936 census:

 Overall population: 1,639,250 people
 Japanese: 20,582 people
 Koreans: 1,614,738 people
 Other: 3,970 people

Administrative divisions

Cities 

 Kaishū (海州) - (capital): Haeju (해주).

Counties 

Hekijō (碧城): Byeokseong (벽성). present Yeonpyeongdo in Byeokseong County is annexed in Incheon Metropolitan City.
Enpaku (延白): Yeonbaek (연백).
Kinsen (金川): Geumcheon (금천).
Heizan (平山): Pyeongsan (평산).
Shinkei (新溪): Singye (신계).
Chōen (長淵): Jangyeon (장연). present Baengnyeongdo, Daecheongdo and Socheongdo in Jangyeon County are annexed in Incheon Metropolitan City.
Shōka (松禾): Songhwa (송화).
Inritsu (殷栗): Eunyul (은율).
Angaku (安岳): Anak (안악).
Shinsen (信川): Sincheon (신천).
Sainei (載寧): Jaeryeong (재령).
Kōshū (黃州): Hwangju (황주).
Hōzan (鳳山): Bongsan (봉산).
Zuikō (瑞興): Seoheung (서흥).
Suian (遂安): Suan (수안).
Kokuzan (谷山): Goksan (곡산).
Ōshin (甕津): Ongjin (옹진).

See also 
Hwanghae Province
Provinces of Korea
Governor-General of Chōsen
Administrative divisions of Korea

Korea under Japanese rule
Former prefectures of Japan in Korea